The content of Japanese animation (anime) is frequently edited by distributors, both for its release in Japan or during subsequent localizations. This happens for a variety for reasons, including translation, censorship, and remastering.

Regional considerations

Japan 
Under article 175 of the Penal Code of Japan, material containing indecent images are prohibited. However the laws date back to 1907 and were unchanged during the process of updating the Japanese constitution in 1947. Over time and due to changing tastes the acceptable standards have become blurred. The display of pubic hair was prohibited until 1991 leading to series such as Lolita Anime and Cream Lemon using the sexualization of children as a loophole. The use of tentacles in series such as Urotsukidōji enabled the creators to avoid a ban on the display of genitals. In other cases, the content is self censored through the use of blurring and black dots. When the censorship is removed for overseas release, the basic animation underneath is revealed, leading to concerns over the sexualization of children in those markets.

Cowboy Bebop and Gantz are examples of titles that received edited broadcasts and were later released as unedited home releases. Episodes of shows such as Mr Osomatsu have been edited for repeats and home releases.

United States 
Due to the lack of a formal and consistent age rating system in the United States of America, age ratings for anime have created several problems. Blockbuster Video marked all anime titles as unsuitable for kids, leading them to appear as R-18 on their computer system. Publishers began using their own age rating suggestions on their releases, however due to differences between publisher assessments and the use of TV age ratings by some this resulted in an inconsistent system.

When Cartoon Network began to broadcast anime there were no internal standards in place for the use of overseas material. This required them to develop a set of standards and guidelines for the handling of the content. The display of alcohol consumption, tobacco smoking, violence (including depictions of death, spoken references to death and dying, scenes of characters being threatened or in life-threatening situations, and depictions of suicide), gambling, blood, offensive language, offensive hand gestures, sexual content (including nudity, intercourse, innuendo, and depictions of homosexual and transsexual characters), and the mistreatment of women and minors were all deemed unacceptable as well as other situations unsuitable to a younger audience. Material for Cartoon Network was edited for TV-Y7, whereas Adult Swim content was edited for TV-14 standards. However some content that aired on Adult Swim was originally scheduled to air on Toonami and was edited accordingly. Autodesk Inferno was used to digitally edit scenes to remove blood or cover up nudity on content edited by Cartoon Network. In some cases content was edited before it was given to Cartoon Network. The editing practices evolved over time due to complaints from parents.

4Kids made changes to the anime they licensed to make them "more Western" in order to be more accessible to children. Another reason was so that they could easily merchandise them. However, they also released uncut versions of some of those shows.

United Kingdom 
In the United Kingdom the Video Recordings Act 1984 and subsequently the Video Recordings Act 2010 make it a legal requirement for all home video media to be certified by the British Board of Film Classification. Sale or hire of unrated media is prohibited however imported media is allowed for personal use providing the content does not breach UK law. The BBFC is responsible for assigning age ratings to video content and if necessary requesting cuts and refusing certification if content fails guidelines. Examples of content deemed unacceptable include graphic violence and scenes of a sexual nature such as underage sex and sexual violence.

A number of releases were substantially cut in order to pass certification including the Urotsukidōji series and Adventure Duo. The Infernal Road entry in the Urotsukidōji series was delayed by the BBFC for three years and included two outright rejections until the final episode was released by itself, with the scripts for the other entries included as DVD extras. La Blue Girl was also refused a classification. La Blue Girl Returns was passed as 18 after heavy mandatory cuts of 35 minutes across 4 episodes. During the early 90s anime in the UK was subject to a negative press campaign by several newspapers as a reaction to the violence and sexualized content in many of the available titles. Publishers took advantage of this through the selected licensing of risqué anime in order to appeal to their chosen market. In 1995, 25% of anime released in the UK at that point was rated 18 and 36% was rated 15. As of 2006 the average work was passed uncut at a 12 rating. In some cases a heavier BBFC rating was actually desired by the publishers with excessive swearing deliberately inserted in order to gain a higher age rating, a process known as fifteening. An example given by the BBFC was Patlabor receiving a 15 rating due to the language used, whereas it would have otherwise passed as a PG.

Australia and New Zealand 
In 2020, the streaming of Interspecies Reviewers on AnimeLab in Australia and New Zealand was delayed due to "adjusting [its] sourcing of materials" after parent company Funimation ceased streaming the series.

Types of editing

Localization 

Localization is an essential process in releasing anime outside of Japan. It can cover a range of different processes depending on the individual title and the desired result. At its most basic level, the localization process is responsible for deciding on romanized character and term names, as well as episode titles. In other cases it may require special attention to areas such as humor where a judgement call must be made to try and retain the feeling of the source material. At its most intense it may involve editing of the content itself in order to fit a target market.

Music 
In some cases, the original Japanese music may be replaced with alternate regional music. This can be either a technical consideration caused by footage getting cut since it is synchronized with the audio on the episode master, or it can be an artistic consideration.

Changes to episode count and order 
The Pokémon episode "Dennō Senshi Porygon" was removed from all repeats and home releases of the series due to an issue during its original broadcast. It was never released in any form outside of Japan. For the North American Blu-ray release of Mobile Suit Gundam series producer Yoshiyuki Tomino removed episode 15 of the series due to its poor quality animation.

Repackaged shows 
The Robotech series was created as a mix of three originally separate and unrelated series The Super Dimensional Fortress Macross, Super Dimension Cavalry Southern Cross and Mospeada. Characters were renamed and the story was adapted to create links between each of the source series. Battle of the Planets was adapted from Science Ninja Team Gatchaman with 85 of the original 106 episodes being adapted by Sandy Frank for US broadcast in 1979.  Along with westernized character names, other changes included the removal of violent scenes and entirely new animation inserted in places. A new character was also created. The series was then released as G-Force: Guardians of Space by Turner Broadcasting, with fewer changes to the original Japanese version.

Nudity and sexuality

As nudity is far more stigmatized in the U.S. than it is in Japan, such content is often edited out of locally distributed anime. Although U.S. law regarding child pornography does not prohibit cartoon pornography, suggested underage nudity is also commonly censored. In the original U.S. release of Sailor Moon, all of the female leads' transformation sequences were airbrushed to remove the lines tracing their breasts and pubic areas (except for Moon and Chibi Moon; their sequences had little or no lines), even though the characters were shown in silhouette form only. This kind of editing is not limited to cartoons aimed at older audiences, either. For example, the anime series Blue Gender contained scenes of sex (next to blood and intense violence), which was edited out when shown in the U.S. on Adult Swim (the series was originally planned to air on Toonami but was considered too graphic). Another example, ADV Films edited out nudity of high-school-aged characters from the American DVD release of the anime Sakura Diaries. However, the edits to the animation were not done by ADV Films but were shown on TV in Japan. The video was already edited for exposed female private parts, and were covered by inserted lingerie. Dialogue was also altered to shield suggestions of adolescent age.   Meanwhile, in February 2008, the government of Canada banned imports of such hentai series Cool Devices and Words Worth, as it cited those series as "obscene" under federal guidelines.

Views

Creators' attitudes 
Hayao Miyazaki's anime film Nausicaä of the Valley of the Wind was heavily edited by New World Pictures in the mid-1980s and released as Warriors of the Wind. About one-quarter of the film was cut and its storyline simplified somewhat, distorting the original's ecological and pacifist themes. Additionally, the voice actors and actresses who dubbed the English dialogue were not really informed of the film's plot. Miyazaki and Studio Ghibli were aware of this editing to the film and were extremely unhappy about it. Miyazaki has since suggested that those who have viewed the edited version should "dismiss it from their minds." As a result of this experience, the studio instituted a "no-cuts" policy of never allowing a foreign company to edit any of its films prior to release in a new market. During the late 1990s and 2000s, Studio Ghibli has allowed its catalog to be dubbed into English by Walt Disney Pictures, on the condition that no frames were removed or airbrushed, and that the English dialogue was not significantly changed from faithful translations of the Japanese versions. Nausicaä of the Valley of the Wind was re-released in its unedited form by Disney in 2005.

The "no-cuts" policy was highlighted when Miramax co-chairman Harvey Weinstein suggested editing Princess Mononoke to make it more marketable and avoid a PG-13 rating. In response, an unnamed Studio Ghibli producer sent him an authentic katana with a message saying "No cuts." Although Studio Ghibli has not allowed Disney to cut the films themselves, some minor changes to translated dialogue have been permitted, including the removal of references to testicles in the English dub of Pom Poko, replacing them with the innocuous euphemism "raccoon pouch".

See also 

 Anime industry
 History of anime
 Re-edited film
 Standards & Practices

References

Citations

Books 
 Clements, Jonathan and Helen McCarthy (2006). The Anime Encyclopedia: A Guide to Japanese Animation since 1917. Stone Bridge Press. .

Further reading

External links 
 The Otaku Alliance (Internet Archive)—"...a group of fans dedicated to fighting companies that have treated anime titles unfairly."
 Anime' No Editing Zone (Mirror Website)—"...dedicated to promoting the idea that all anime deserves to be brought over to the North American market uncut, unedited, uncensored, and as unaltered as reasonably possible."
  An editorial addressing the issues of fan desires in anime localization.

Anime industry
Television censorship in the United States
 
Television censorship in the United Kingdom
Adaptation (arts)
Dubbing (filmmaking)